is a Japanese shōjo manga series written and illustrated by the manga group Clamp. It is a sequel to Clamp's manga Cardcaptor Sakura and focuses on Sakura Kinomoto in junior high school. The manga began serialization in Kodansha's Nakayoshi magazine with the July 2016 issue. A 22-episode anime television series adaptation by Madhouse, featuring the cast and staff from the original series, aired from January to June 2018, which loosely adapts the first twenty-four chapters.

Plot

Sakura Kinomoto is starting junior high school alongside her friends, including her boyfriend Syaoran Li, who had just returned to Tomoeda. After having a prophetic dream about a mysterious cloaked figure, all of the Sakura Cards turn blank and are rendered completely powerless, thus starting her quest to find out what is wrong. In doing so, Sakura and her friends, along with her guardians and protectors Cerberus and Yue, discover and capture the transparent cards, using the new and much stronger mystical dream key. Eriol, Spinel Sun and Ruby Moon appear as supporting characters, as does Kaho Mizuki, having returned to England, but continuing to aid Sakura and her protectors from afar. Sakura ends up befriending a transfer student named Akiho Shinomoto and meets her butler and guardian Yuna D. Kaito, from whom Syaoran detects supreme levels of magical power.

Media

Manga

Cardcaptor Sakura: Clear Card is written and illustrated by the manga artist group Clamp. It began serialization in the monthly shōjo (aimed at young girls) manga magazine Nakayoshi with the July 2016 issue sold on June 3. Kodansha Comics is releasing the series in English both digitally and in print.

Anime

A 22-episode anime television series adaptation aired from January 7 to June 10, 2018 with Morio Asaka, Nanase Ohkawa and Madhouse returning from the original anime series to direct, write and produce the new adaptation, respectively, loosely adapted from the first twenty-eight chapters of the manga. Kunihiko Hamada replaced Kumiko Takahashi as the character designer from the original series. The main cast from the original anime also returns to reprise their roles. An original video animation prequel titled Sakura and the Two Bears, which bridges the stories of the "Sakura Card Arc" and the "Clear Card Arc", had its world premiere at Anime Expo on July 1, 2017 and shipped in Japan as a DVD bundled with the special edition of volume 3 of the manga on September 13, 2017. 

The first opening theme for the series is "Clear" by Maaya Sakamoto, while the first ending theme is "Jewelry" by Saori Hayami. Funimation premiered the simuldub on January 24, 2018. The second opening theme is "Rocket Beat" by Kiyono Yasuno while the second ending theme is "Rewind" by Minori Suzuki. The series was released in Japan on Blu-ray and DVD in eight volumes from May to November 2018. In 2019, Funimation released the series in two Blu-ray sets of 11 episodes each in North America on February 5 and July 2. Funimation released the complete series in one Blu-ray volume on August 11, 2020.

Video game
Bushiroad and Monster Lab created a mobile game for iOS and Android titled Cardcaptor Sakura: Clear Card Happiness Memories and launched it on October 3, 2019. The game's theme song is "Flash" by Maaya Sakamoto. In May 2020, Bushiroad and Monster Lab announced they were ending services for the game on June 30, 2020 due to the "state of the game" and "current operations situation."

Reception
It was reported in April 2017 that over 1 million copies of the manga were in print in Japan. In reviewing volumes 1 and 2 of the manga, Erica Friedman, founder of Yuricon called the sequel "honest-to-goodness", and said that those who enjoy the original series will enjoy this manga, and said she was happy with "this kiddy ride full of pretty art and nice kids", but gave low-ratings for yuri themes.

The anime adaptation received mixed reviews. Miranda Sanchez of IGN reviewed the first two episodes of the series, praising the storytelling, and animation style, but was critical of the second episode, calling it "mundane". Geordi Demorest of Anime Feminist criticized the series, arguing that while the original Cardcaptor Sakura is beloved for its "LGBTQ-inclusiveness," this sequel seems "less actively progressive" and is missing the original focus on "explicitly representing LGBTQ characters". Lynzee Loveridge of Anime News Network wrote that she was unsure whether the series added "anything worthwhile to characters' stories" and argued that it is a "facsimile of the previous series," with no traditional villains. Tim Jones and Stig Høgset of THEM Anime Reviews gave the series a more positive review. Jones said he had some hesitation to start the series, as it was three years after Sailor Moon Crystal, while Høgset called the show like "a fun family reunion" and praised the background art for the series.

Timothy Donohoo of CBR stated the series was "largely forgotten" by fans and the anime industry because it was a "disappointing affair for many" because it ran for 22 episodes, calling it a "mediocre rehash" of the original and "painfully mediocre". Charles Solomon of Animation Scoop praised the series for its animation quality, but said that the series "faltered" by coping the original series "too closely", had an ending that was too abrupt, and stated that elements like Tomoyo’s love for Sakura, the crush of Sakura on Yuki and acceptance of him as the lover of Toya "fell by the wayside." Jack Eaton of Gamerant noted that the series did not receive "the same critical and commercial success" as the original, and called for a "a second chance at a sequel" which is more fitting than this series, or a remastering of the original. Shamus Kelley, in his review of the final three episodes of the series for Den of Geek, criticizing the ending as a "convoluted mess", called the plot "heavy-handed", noted the series focus on Tomoyo's "endless obsession with Sakura", and praised the series as "really fun" but fighting "against itself." In reviews of other episodes within the series, Kelley criticized the plot as "fairly lackluster", not expanding on possible queer themes, "lazily aping" the original series, and described the plot as creepy.

References

External links
 

 
2016 manga
2018 anime television series debuts
2018 Japanese television series endings
Japanese children's animated action television series
Japanese children's animated fantasy television series
Anime series based on manga
Crunchyroll anime
Funimation
Kodansha manga
Madhouse (company)
Magical girl anime and manga
Medialink
NHK original programming
Sequel television series
Shōjo manga
Works by Clamp (manga artists)